Iwatayama Monkey Park (Japanese: 嵐山モンキーパーク, Arashiyama Monkī Pāku) is a commercial park located in Arashiyama in Kyoto, Japan. The park is on Mt Arashiyama, on the opposite side of the Ōi River as the train station. It is inhabited by a troop of over 120 Japanese macaque monkeys. The animals are wild but can be fed food purchased at the site.

Iwatayama Monkey Park in media
The park is featured in an episode of the anime series K-On!.

References

External links
Official site

Information in Japanese

Parks and gardens in Kyoto Prefecture
Tourist attractions in Kyoto
Monkey parks